Arman Smailov (Arman Smaılov; born 26 August 1981) is a rally driver from Kazakhstan. Making his WRC debut at the 2010 Rally Finland made Smailov the first WRC driver from independent Kazakhstan. He has set many Kazakh records in the World Rally Championship in the process.

In 2013, he drove in the 2013 WRC-2 season in a Subaru Impreza STi, and recorded a best finish of 4th in Australia, winning the Production Class. This made him the first Kazakh winner.

References

External links
eWRC results

Kazakhstani sportspeople
Rally drivers
1981 births
World Rally Championship drivers
Living people